Omnion is the fourth studio album by Hercules and Love Affair, released on September 1, 2017.

Track listing

Track listing adapted from Consequence of Sound.

Charts

References

2017 albums
Hercules and Love Affair albums